Lee Lim-chhiu (22 April 1909 – 12 February 1979), or Lee Lin-chiu in Mandarin, was a Taiwanese songwriter. He was born in Taipei, graduated from the public school in 1922 and did not receive any further education. Lee was the writer of Bang Chhun Hong, a well-known popular Hokkien song which was composed by Teng U-hian. Additionally, he also wrote some other songs such as Su Kui Hong (四季紅) and Po Phoa Bang (補破網).

References

Taiwanese songwriters
Taiwanese people of Hoklo descent
1909 births
1979 deaths
Musicians from Taipei